Sad Girl may refer to:

Music
Sad Girl (album), by Amy Allison (2001)
Sad Girl (EP), by Sasha Sloan (2018)

Songs
"Sad Girl", song written by Jay Wiggins, Lloyd Smith first released by Jay Wiggins in 1963. Covered by Joe Bataan, 	Curtis And The Showstoppers	1965, The Gallahads	1965, The Intruders, GQ 1982	
"Sad Girl", song by	The Stems	Dom Mariani 1987
"Sad Girl", song by	Thee Midniters	Sam Johnson 1965
"Sad Girl", song by	Lana Del Rey from Ultraviolence
"Sad Girl", song by Amy Allison from Sad Girl
"Sad Girl", song by	Carol Anderson
"Sad Girl", song by Ten in the Swear Jar from Accordion Solo!
"Sad Girl", song by Savannah Keyes which represented Utah in the American Song Contest
"Sad Pony Guerrilla Girl", by Xiu Xiu from A Promise

Other
"Sad Girl", the comic by Lisa and Marge from Season 29, Episode 2 of The Simpsons, "Springfield Splendor"